Lawrence is an unincorporated community in Newton County, Mississippi, United States.

History
Lawrence was established in 1866 and named for a railroad employee.   A post office was established in 1867.  Lawrence was a thriving town with multiple mills, stores, a town physician, and churches.  In 1878, Lawrence experienced a yellow fever epidemic, which decreased its population size. Several people also left Lawrence. After the epidemic, the town was busier, with several business firms and mills. Its economy relied heavily on the fruit crop it was locally noted for.  By the 1900s, Lawrence had  two churches, several  general  stores, and a grist mill.  The population   in   1900 was  75, and was estimated to be 125 by 1906.

Notes

Unincorporated communities in Newton County, Mississippi
Unincorporated communities in Mississippi